= World Federation Autistic Centre =

Center for people with Autism in Tanzania

Coordinates: 6.79784°S 39.278819°E

- Formation: 19 February 2006; 20 years ago
- Location: Dar es Salaam, Tanzania

The World Federation Autistic Day Care Centre in Dar es Salaam, Tanzania was officially opened on 19 February 2006 by the President of The World Federation of KSIMC Dr Ahmed Hassam.

It will provide diagnosis treatment and rehabilitation for children with disabilities, including those with autism and chronic conditions.
